This is a list of administrators and governors of Nasarawa State.
Nasarawa State, Nigeria was created on October 1st, 1996 when it was split from Plateau State.

See also
List of governors of Plateau State
States of Nigeria
List of state governors of Nigeria

References

Nasarawa
Governors
Government of Nasarawa State